Gospel Aerobics is a form of rhythmic aerobic exercise that uses gospel music and spiritual encouragement.

The term and the idea of "Gospel Aerobics" were developed by Maryland-based Hope and Marc Mason. In 1996, the television show entitled Gospel Aerobics was produced by the couple who later went on to win an award for its first season in 1997. Now, Gospel Aerobics classes are offered throughout the United States and abroad in churches, video productions, and fitness centers.

References 

https://web.archive.org/web/20110407073608/http://www.baltimoregrassrootsmedia.org/PublicAccessTV/HistoryTimeline/HistoryTimeline.html
https://web.archive.org/web/20110812045616/http://baltimoregrassrootsmedia.org/Opinion93-7/Opinion93-7.html
http://www2.citypaper.com/news/story.asp?id=4800
http://tv.gawker.com/5453632/heartbeats--hallelujahs-gospel-aerobics
https://web.archive.org/web/20130122191754/http://www.hhs.gov/secretary/about/speeches/sp20110607.html

Aerobic exercise
Gospel music
Exercise organizations
Exercise-related trademarks